Sakarya Gas Field is a natural gas field of sweet gas in the Black Sea, planned to be connected to the Filyos Natural-gas Processing Plant.

References

Black Sea energy
Natural gas fields in Turkey
2020 establishments in Turkey